Banlung municipality is a municipality (krong) in Ratanakiri province, northeast of Cambodia. In 1998, it had a population of 16,999. It surrounds the provincial capital of Banlung.

Administration
As of 2020, the municipality is subdivided into 4 communes (sangkat) and further subdivided into 19 villages (phum).

References

Districts of Ratanakiri province